Knock Castle may refer to

 Knock Castle (Isle of Skye), Scotland
 Knock Castle (Aberdeenshire), Scotland
 Knock Castle, Largs, North Ayrshire, Scotland